FN-6 or Feinu-6 is a third-generation passive infrared homing (IR) man portable air defence system (MANPADS). Development from HN-5 missile, FN-6 missile is an export-oriented product and China's most advanced surface-to-air missile offered on the international market. Specially designed to engage low-flying targets, it has a range of 6 km and a maximum altitude of 3.8 km. The missile has been exported to Malaysia, Cambodia, Sudan, Pakistan, and Peru, and a variant was incorporated into People's Liberation Army (PLA) service as the HN-6. Based on FN-6, China has several numbers of other MANPADS and other vehicle-based short-range air defense systems.

Development
The weapon was specifically designed to be used against targets flying at low and very low altitudes. The FN-6 was developed in parallel with the Qian Wei (QW) missile series. FN-6, or FeiNu-6, is the export name given to the export version derived from this system, and it is known as HongYing-6 in the PLA. The training simulator of FN-6 is not developed by the contractor of the missile system, but instead, the simulator is developed by PLA itself after the missile was purchased, and the general designer of the training simulator of FN-6 is Mr. Liu Weixing. The training simulator of FN-6 is also used for later versions of MANPADS developed from FN-6.

Export sales of the weapon is the responsibility of China National Precision Machinery Import and Export Corporation, a state-owned trading company responsible for representing the domestic defense production industry in air defense-related products.

Design
According to Janes, the FN-6 is a third generation, passive infrared, man-portable air defense system (MANPADS). It is equipped with a digital infrared seeker with a strong resistance to flares, solar heat and heat from the ground. The pyramid shaped nose of the missile houses the four unit infrared seeker. The handle of the launcher houses the batteries and cooling system. An IFF antenna and an optional clip-on optical sight are fitted onto the launcher.

The missile is capable of an all-aspect attack and has a 70% single-shot hit probability. It can engage targets maneuvering at up to 4 g. When FN-6 MANPADS can be equipped with night vision equipment, and it can also be equipped with IFF systems. Two types were shown to the public, one of which is similar in appearance to AN/PPX-1 IFF of FIM-92 Stinger, while the other IFF system is a Yagi-Uda antenna configuration.

The complete FN-6 missile system weighs 16 kg. The missile is 1.495 m in length, and has a diameter of 0.072 m. The weight of the missile is 10.77 kg. It uses a single-stage solid rocket motor, and can obtain a maximum speed of 360 m/s when flying head-on, and 300 m/s when tail chasing. The missile's operating range is from 500 m to 6 km, and its operating altitude is from 15 m to 3.5 km.

Further developments

FN-6A
FN-6A is the vehicle-mounted version of FN-6 first revealed to the public in 2005. The system is based on a Dongfeng EQ2050, weighing 4.6 tons in total. A one-man turret is sandwiched between two quadruple launchers, and the electro-optical fire control system (FCS) with IR, laser, and TV sensors. Contrary to the common arrangements on similar systems, the FCS of FN-6A is mounted under the launchers. Due to space limitations, the FCS is distributed between two places, one portion under one launcher and the other portion in the opposite launcher across the turret. A 12.7 mm heavy machine gun is added for additional protection. The vehicle is operated by a two-man crew, one driver, and one weapon system operator. Communication gear and land navigation gear are standard. The modular design of the system enables other subsystems to be incorporated easily, such as IFF. The auxiliary power unit provides enough power for the system to operate continuously for more than 8 hours.

The FCS of the FN-6A can lock on to a target 10 km away, and the reaction time is less than 5 seconds. Each vehicle can fight independently but can be integrated with others to fight as a coherent unit by incorporating a command vehicle that is also based on the same vehicle chassis. The command vehicle provides a light solid-state passive phased array radar to increase situational awareness and can direct up to 8 launching vehicles simultaneously. A command vehicle and 8 launching vehicles form an air defense company when fighting as a coherent unit, and this in turn can be integrated into larger air defense networks. Alternatively, the launching vehicle can be directly integrated into larger air defense networks without the need for the command vehicle.

Each launching vehicle needs a support vehicle for resupply, and the support vehicle is also based on Dongfeng EQ2050 to reduce logistic costs. Each supply vehicle carries 24 missiles and reloading each missile takes less than a minute. Similar to the M1097 Avenger, each launcher is designed so that each missile can also be removed and fired by a soldier manually like a regular MANPAD. Although effective against supersonic aircraft, for UAVs and missiles the maximum target speed is limited to 300 meters per second.

FB-6A
FN-6A did not enter mass production and served only in very limited numbers in Chinese forces, mainly for trial purposes. In the subsequent Zhuhai Airshows followed by its original debut, FN-6A is replaced by its successor FB-6A, which did see greater numbers in service with Chinese forces. The general designer of the FB-6A system is Mr. Wei Zhigang (卫志刚), rumored also to be the general designer of FN-6A, the predecessor of FB-6A. The main difference between FN-6A and its successor FB-6A is that the SAM system is broken down into two portions in the latter, as opposed to a single unit in the former: FB-6A SAM system consists of two vehicles, one carrying the engagement radar, while the other carrying the missile. The search/engagement radar of FB-6A is planar array, and can be folded down in transit, but the developer has not revealed whether the radar itself is a phased array or not. However, the developer did claim that both the mechanically scanned planar array and the electronically scanned passive phased array are both available upon customer's request, but it's not clear which one is in service with Chinese forces.

The missile launching platform of FB-6A differs from its predecessor in that both the 12.7 mm heavy machine (HMG) for self-protection and the electro-optical fire control sight on that of FN-6A are removed, but a backup operator console is incorporated with bulletproof glass added between the launchers, though the FB-6A system can be operated with the vehicle. Although the 12.7 mm HMG no longer comes as standard equipment for the FB-6A, it can be added as an option and can be changed to other machine guns. The total numbers of missiles carried by the launching vehicle of FB-6A remain the same as FN-6A, which is eight.

An upgraded version FB-6C was unveiled at the 2016 Zhuhai Airshow.

FN-16
At the 7th Zhuhai Airshow held at the end of 2008, China revealed a new addition to FN series MANPAD, FN-16. FN-16 is an improvement of earlier FN-6, with better all aspect attack capability and better resistance against electronic countermeasures.  Another major improvement is in its seeker, which in addition to the original IR guidance, UV guidance is also incorporated, a practice adopted in the later version of FIM-92 Stinger. Like its predecessor FN-6, FN-16 can also be fitted with both IFF systems used on FN-6, and just like FN-6, FN-16 is re-designated as FY-16 (Fei Ying = 飞鹰, meaning Flying Eagle) when equipped with IFFs. The missile system is designed to counter fighter-bomber, attack aircraft, and helicopters.
UAV, cruise missile etc.
Specifications:
Length: ≤1,600 mm
Diameter: 72 mm
Weight: ≤11.5 kg (missile)
Range: 500 m to 6000 m
Altitude: 10 m to 4000 m
Overload: ≥18 g
Guidance System: Infrared homing/Ultraviolet dual-spectrum seeker

HN-6
HN-6 is a further development of FN-16 in Chinese military service. HN-6 utilizes fire control systems (FCS) of earlier FN-6 and FN-16 MANPADS, but a new FCS sight of unknown designation has also been developed.

In addition to improved performance over the original FN-6/16 MANPADS, HN-6 incorporates a protective cap over the seeker of missile, offering better protection against the environmental elements. Based on the photos and video clips of PLA training, this protective cap needs to be manually removed before firing the missile.

HN-6 can also be incorporated into a portable tripod firing station similar to that of RBS 70 and Mistral. A seat is attached to the lightweight tripod firing stand that can be folded for transportation and storage, and the operator is protected by a bulletproof glass shield.

Opertional history

Syrian Civil War
The combat debut of the FN-6 came during the 2013 phase of the Syrian civil war. By March 2013, two Syrian Air Force Mil Mi-8 or Mi-17 were shot down.

The New York Times reported that Qatar supplied the Syrian rebels, possibly through purchase from the Sudanese inventory, with the FN-6 and that several units have now fallen into the hands of ISIS. However, spray paint had been used to obscure serial numbers in an effort to impede tracking of the weapon's supply chain.

The Global Times, states that, though Chinese-made missiles have downed aircraft in the past, the Syrian war "is the first time such a success has been recorded on video." The news outlet further raises the possibility of this improving the sales and image of Chinese defense products abroad. The New York Times, though claims that rebels have complained the missile's performance, such as failings to fire or lock on and two premature explosions while firing, which killed two rebels and wounded four more.

On 18 August 2013, the first recorded kill of a fixed-wing aircraft took place when a team from the Islamic Harakat Ahrar ash-Sham Al Islami brigade downed a SyAAF MiG-21 over Latakia province. The jet's pilot was filmed parachuting but his fate is not known. This downing is also the FN-6's first jet kill.

ISIL in Iraq
In the aftermath of the 2014 ISIL offensive in Iraq, on 3 October, an FN-6 allegedly supplied by Qatar was used by the militant group to shoot down an Iraqi Army Mil Mi-35 attack helicopter near Baiji. It also may have been used to destroy a Bell 407 scout helicopter in the same area on 8 October, killing both pilots.

Variants
FN-6 original MANPADS variant
FN-6A vehicle-mounted air defense system that mounts 8 FN-6 missiles.
FB-6A vehicle-mounted air defense system with separate radar and missile vehicles. 
FB-6C improved FB-6A
FN-16 improved MANPADS variant based on FN-6
NH-6 improved MANPADS variant based on FN-16
PGZ-04A Four FN-6 missiles are mounted on the upgraded Type 95 SPAAA.

Operators

 : Bangladesh Army uses FN16 variant.
 
 : On 25 June 2009, the National Television of Cambodia (TVK) showed Cambodian soldiers with FN-6 and FN-16 missiles to be deployed near the Thai-Cambodian border in the 2008 Cambodian-Thai stand-off. 
 : The FN-6 has been taken into service with the PLAGF and PLAAF. In PLAAF, the FN-6 is deployed in various ground-to-air missile units to provide extra layer of air defence, and to protect high value weaponry from enemy's low-fly aircraft or weapons. In many PLAAF live firing exercise, FN-6s were seen to participate in action.
 : 100 FN-6 missiles delivered on 2016.
 : The CNPMIEC offered to sell FN-6 missiles to Malaysia for purchasing the KSA-1A medium range surface-to-air missiles. In May 2004, a memorandum of understanding was signed with Malaysia for the transfer of technology of the FN-6.
 : First spotted in Namibian service in 2016, confirmed in August 2018. 50 speculated to be in service.
 : 295 FN-16 MANPADS valued at US$25.13 million ordered during 2017–2018.
 : A small batch of FN-6 missiles was acquired by the Peruvian Navy in July 2009 for US$1.1 million
 
 : displayed at Sudan's Independence Day military parade of 2007. Produced as the "Nayzak".

Non-state actors
 Free Syrian Army
 
 Kachin Independence Army: Allegedly received and used some from the UWSA.
 Ta'ang National Liberation Army
 United Wa State Army: Reportedly acquired in 2012 as part of an efforts to improve its anti-aircraft capabilities

See also
 Anza
 Misagh-2
 Qaem

Reference list

External links
 FN-6 in Syrian war  (Simplified Chinese)

Missile defense
Surface-to-air missiles of the People's Republic of China
Weapons of the People's Republic of China
Military equipment introduced in the 2000s